Myxophyllum is a genus of ciliates belonging to the family Thigmophryidae. As of 2021, its status in zoological nomenclature is uncertain.

Species
 Myxophyllum magnum Xu & Song, 2000
 Myxophyllum steenstrupi (Stein, 1861) Raabe, 1934

References

Philasterida
Ciliate genera